

M

M